Cygnus X was a trance music project from Germany named after the famous X-ray binary star Cygnus X-1. It began as a collaboration between Matthias Hoffmann and Ralf Hildenbeutel, who later left. Other projects of the pair include A.C. Boutsen, Brainchild and Dee.FX. Their sound extends from hard to ambient trance.

Their first release was "Superstring" in 1993. Their third trance track, "The Orange Theme", released in 1994, was the project's best received track, borrowing the melodic theme of Henry Purcell's classical composition "Music for the Funeral of Queen Mary" (also appearing as theme music for Stanley Kubrick's film "A Clockwork Orange", which arguably is the reference of the track title). Their releases "Positron" and "Hypermetrical" became also well known hits of the genre.

Several years later, "The Orange Theme" and "Superstring" were given new remixes and became chart hits. The Bervoets & De Goeij remix of "The Orange Theme" charted at #43 in the UK Singles Chart in March 2000, followed by the Rank 1 remix of "Superstring" charting at #33 in August 2001.

Discography

Album

Compilation albums
"Collected Works" (2003)

Singles
"Superstring" (1993) - UK #33 in 2001
"Positron" (1993)
"The Orange Theme" (1994) - UK #43 in 2000
"Kinderlied" (1995)
"Turn Around" (1995)
"Synchronism" (1995)
"Hypermetrical" (1995)

Remixes
MIR - "Under The Milkyway" (1996)
Baby Fox - "Baby Fox" - Rain (1997)
Art of Trance - "Madagascar" (1998)
Art of Trance - "Breathe" (1999)
Art of Trance - "Easter Island" (1999)

References

External links
Cygnus X on global-trance.co.uk
Cygnus X at Discogs

German trance music groups